Donacaula aquilella is a moth in the family Crambidae. It was described by James Brackenridge Clemens in 1860. It is found in North America, where it has been recorded from Alabama, Georgia, Massachusetts, Mississippi, New Jersey, New York, North Carolina and South Carolina.

Description
The length of the forewings is 21–35 mm. The forewings of the males are brown with scattered yellow scales and with a small black discal spot. Females have a yellow costal band on the forewings and there is no discal spot. The male hindwings are yellowish white with two longitudinal, brown lines. The female hindwings are yellowish white, with some veins tinged with light brown. Adults have been recorded on wing from April to September and in December.

References

Moths described in 1860
Schoenobiinae